The Lorentz catfish (Cinetodus conorhynchus) is a species of sea catfish endemic to West Papua in Indonesia where it is known from the Lorentz River and Fly River systems.

References

 

Cinetodus
Freshwater fish of Western New Guinea
Taxonomy articles created by Polbot
Fish described in 1913
Taxobox binomials not recognized by IUCN